ORBit is a CORBA 2.4 compliant Object Request Broker (ORB).  It features mature Ada, C, C++ and Python bindings, and less developed bindings for Perl, Lisp, Pascal, Ruby, and Tcl.  Most of the code is distributed under the LGPL license, although the IDL compiler and utilities use the GPL.

ORBit was originally written to serve as middleware for the GNOME project, but has seen use outside of the project.

External links

ORBit2 Home Page
ORBit Resource Page

GNOME
Common Object Request Broker Architecture